Necla Pur (born 23 November 1943) is a Turkish economist and professor. She is the former rector of Marmara University.

References
Marmara University IT Department

1943 births
Living people
Rectors of universities and colleges in Turkey
Turkish women academics
Academic staff of Marmara University
Women heads of universities and colleges